Sir John Brewer Davis (1741 – 9 November 1817) was the son of the Rev Dr D Davis Prebendary of Canterbury. He is notable for his involvement in first-class cricket through his connections with the Kent county team. In 1774, he sat on a committee of gentry that laid down the first known laws of cricket.

Davis was active as a player before cricket's statistical record began in 1772. In the 1773 season, he has been recorded in two first-class matches playing for Kent against Surrey. He scored 23 and 4 in the first match at Laleham Burway and 4 and 0 in the return game at Bourne Paddock. He took 2 catches in the latter match.

He was a Captain in the West Kent Militia. In the summer of 1778 the regiment was encamped at Winchester, Hampshire, and as the senior regiment in camp provided the King's Guard when George III visited on 28 September. Captain Davis commanded the  guard of honour and next day the King conferred a knighthood on him, the first militia officer to be so honoured for this service.

References

English cricketers
English cricketers of 1701 to 1786
Kent cricketers
Kent Militia officers
1741 births
1817 deaths
Place of birth unknown
Date of birth unknown